This is a list of flag bearers who have represented Bhutan at the Olympics.

Flag bearers carry the national flag of their country at the opening ceremony of the Olympic Games.

See also
Bhutan at the Olympics

References

Bhutan at the Olympics
Bhutan
Olympic